Romance of the Three Kingdoms XIII, also known as , is the 13th installment in the Romance of the Three Kingdoms (Sangokushi) strategy game series by Koei. It was released on January 28, 2016 for the PlayStation 4, PlayStation 3, Xbox One, and Microsoft Windows in Japan. While it can be imported or purchased on PC worldwide it was not initially available in English like the previous installment. However, as part of the 30th Anniversary of the series, a localized version of the game was released on PlayStation 4 and PC in July 2016. Two modes featured in the game are the traditional campaign mode and a hero mode that teaches players about the game's mechanics. The upgraded version, titled Romance of the Three Kingdoms XIII with Power-Up Kit, will get a digital only in Japan on February 16, 2017 on Xbox One. The English version was released on Xbox One in April 2017.

Gameplay

Reception
The game received an aggregated review score of 36 out of 40 from Famitsu magazine.

It sold 7,719 copies within its first week of release in Japan.

References

External links 
Gamecity Japan RTK13 page 
Koei Tecmo America's RTK13 page 

2016 video games
Grand strategy video games
13
Turn-based strategy video games
Nintendo Switch games
PlayStation 3 games
PlayStation 4 games
PlayStation Vita games
Video games developed in Japan
Windows games
Xbox One games